The 2022 South Dakota Secretary of State election was held on November 8, 2022, to elect the next secretary of state of South Dakota. Incumbent Republican Steve Barnett ran for re-election, but was defeated at the state convention by Monae Johnson.

Republican primary

Candidates

Nominee
Monae Johnson, secretary of state office worker

Eliminated at Convention
Steve Barnett, incumbent secretary of state

Democratic primary

Candidates

Nominee
Thomas Cool, candidate for the South Dakota Senate in 2010, 2012, 2014, 2016, 2018, and 2020.

Libertarian convention

Candidates

Nominee
Kurt Evans, teacher

General election

Predictions

References

Secretary of State
South Dakota
South Dakota Secretary of State elections